FM! is the third studio album by American rapper Vince Staples, released on November 2, 2018, through Blacksmith Records and Def Jam Recordings. The album is primarily produced by Kenny Beats, with further production by Hagler, Cubeatz and KillaGraham, and features guest vocals from Kamaiyah, E-40, Jay Rock, Kehlani, Earl Sweatshirt, Buddy and Tyga, among others.

Composition
Over the course of an approximately 22-minute runtime, the album is framed as a radio-station takeover, featuring recurring skits hosted by Los Angeles radio host Big Boy. According to NPR Music staff writer Rodney Carmichael, "FM! uses terrestrial radio — and longtime L.A. radio staple Big Boy's morning show — as a foil to offer subversive commentary on the ways and means black music is marketed for mass consumption. Even the features — Cali artists including Kamaiyah, E-40, Buddy, Kehlani and two diametrically opposed interludes from Earl Sweatshirt and Tyga — present a range of extremes that deconstruct the static separating radio and Internet, alternative and pop."

Critical reception

FM! was met with widespread critical acclaim. At Metacritic, which assigns a normalized rating out of 100 to reviews from professional publications, the album received an average score of 81, based on 16 reviews. Aggregator AnyDecentMusic? gave it 7.2 out of 10, based on their assessment of the critical consensus.

Neil Z. Yeung of AllMusic gave the album a positive review stating, "Despite FM!s brevity, Staples jams so much into every bar that it fully satiates, all while still managing to end so abruptly that it comes as a surprise. The electrifying thrill of FM! is a triumph for the rapper who remains at the top of his game". Pitchforks Alphonse Pierre wrote, "Vince is at ease here, intertwining his personality into his somber celebration of Long Beach like never before. He's rapping his ass off, and hooks are mostly an afterthought. He dips in and out of inventive flows". Chris Gibbons of XXL wrote: "FM! is definitely more centrally focused than either of those EPs [2014's Hell Can Wait and 2016's Prima Donna]. And even if this is just an off-hand project Vince recorded quickly, it's a hell of a one-off album that's full of charm and lyrical depth paired with fantastic production. Tune in." NME critic Dhruva Balram said, "Each idea is significantly different from the last and this latest album is an immersive look at the grizzly realities of millions". Clayton Tomlinson of Exclaim! said, "Vince has managed to not only be acerbic but entertaining on his newest release. Its only drawback is its extremely short runtime". Nick Flanagan of Now concluded: "With production duties primarily hot potatoed between Hagler and Kenny Beats, the beats and feel are consistent and strong while not getting in the way of Staples' flow, which is elastic and modern without losing an inch of his clarity and bluntness."

Tommy Monroe of Consequence stated that "FM! features the rapper in his raw form and representing his love for the west coast. Whether you decide to hit play in chronological order or skip around, this album will have you bobbing your head at any point. FM! is a sunny day that not even being stuck in LA traffic can ruin". Will Richards from DIY stated, "While Big Fish Theory saw the rapper centre stage, relentless and omnipresent, on FM! he lets us tune in to a calmer world, one which he dips in and out of when he pleases, filling in the blanks and staying in the fast lane". Shea Serrano at The Ringer called the album "smart, and biting, and funny, and challenging, and a top-level examination of the caustic (and casual) existence of violence and death in an overlooked corner of America".

Less enthusiastic was Vice magazine's Robert Christgau, who expressed his disappointment in finding Staples "a lot better at tragedy than comedy" on the album. He rated it with a one-star honorable mention while picking "Feels Like Summer" and "Fun" as highlights.

Year-end lists

Track listing
All tracks produced by Kenny Beats, except where noted.

Notes
  signifies transcription
  signifies additional production

Personnel
Credits for FM! adapted from vinyl liner notes.

Vocalists
 Vincent Staples – vocals (tracks 1–4, 6–8 and 11)
 Earl Sweatshirt – vocals (track 5)
 Tyga – vocals (track 9)
 Ty Dolla Sign – additional vocals (track 1)
 Vonnie – additional vocals (tracks 1 and 11)
 James Larsen – additional vocals (track 2)
 Briana Lee – additional vocals (track 2)
 Adrian Tupas – additional vocals (track 2)
 Mila Tambaoan – additional vocals (track 2)
 Amos (Kaden) Chea – additional vocals (track 2)
 Jay Rock – additional vocals (track 3)
 E-40 – additional vocals (track 7)
 Kamaiyah – additional vocals (track 8)
 Kehlani – additional vocals (track 11)
 Buddy – additional vocals (track 11)

Technical personnel
 Tyler Page – recording engineering (tracks 1–8 and 11)
 Michael Law Thomas – recording engineering (tracks 2, 4, 6–8 and 11)
 James Royo – recording engineering (tracks 1 and 5)
 Christian "CQ" Quiñonez – recording engineering (track 9)
 Oliver "Odrizz" Krueger – assistant recording engineering (track 6)
 Derek "MixedByAli" Ali – mixing
 Aria Angel Ali – mixing
 Cyrus "NOIS" Taghipour – assistant mixing

Charts

See also 
 The Who Sell Out, a 1967 concept album by the Who framed as a pirate radio show

References

2018 albums
Albums produced by Cubeatz
Albums produced by Loudpvck
Def Jam Recordings albums
Vince Staples albums